Nadezhda or Nadežda (Cyrillic: Надежда) is a Slavic female given name popular in Russia, Ukraine, Bulgaria, Serbia, Croatia and other Slavic countries, as well as other former Soviet states such as Azerbaijan, Uzbekistan etc. It means "hope". A Russian-language diminutive form of this name is Nadia (Cyrillic Надя). The Belarusian version is Nadzeya (Надзея, Łacinka: Nadzieja, like in Polish), the Ukrainian version is Nadiya (Надія), and the Czech version is Naděžda, where it can also be shortened to Nad'a. In Serbo-Croatian, it can be shortened to Nada or Nađa.

In politics and news media 
 Nadezhda Alliluyeva (Надежда Аллилуева, 1901–1932), second wife of Joseph Stalin
 Nadezhda Bondarenko (Надежда Бондаренко, born 1950), Transnistrian politician and presidential candidate in the 2006 election
 Nadezhda Chaikova (Надежда Чайкова, 1963–1996), Russian correspondent known for exposés of Russian military atrocities and close contacts with the Chechen rebels
 Nadezhda Joffe (Надежда Иоффе, 1906–1999), Soviet Trotskyist and daughter of Soviet leader Adolph Joffe
 Nadezhda Krupskaya (Надежда Крупская, 1869–1939), Russian Marxist revolutionary and wife of Vladimir Lenin
 Nadezhda Neynsky, (Надежда Нейнски, born 1962; formerly Nadezhda Mihaylova, Надежда Михайлова), MEP since 2009, Bulgarian foreign minister 1997–2001, also leader of the Union of Democratic Forces from 2002 to 2005
 Nadezhda Sigida (Надежда Сигид, 1862–1889), Russian revolutionary and central figure of the Kara katorga tragedy
 Nadezhda Tolokonnikova (Надежда Толоконникова, born 1989), political activist and artist, nicknamed Nadya Tolokno (Надя Толокно); member of the feminist punk-rock collective Pussy Riot
 Nadezhda Tylik, a Kursk sailor's mother who was forcibly sedated on an internationally distributed news clip
 Nadezhda Vasilyeva (Надежда Васильева, died 1971), one of several women claiming to be Grand Duchess Anastasia Nikolaevna of Russia

Sports
 Nadezhda Belonenko (Надежда Белоненко, 1911–1964), Soviet-Russian tennis player
 Nadezhda Besfamilnaya (Надежда Бесфамильная, born 1950), Olympic bronze medal-winning Soviet sprinter
 Nadezhda Chizhova (Надежда Чижова, born 1945), Olympic gold, silver and bronze medal-winning Soviet shot putter
 Nadia Comăneci (born 1961) Romanian gymnast and a five-time Olympic gold medalist
 Nadezhda Frolenkova (Надежда Фроленкова, born 1989), Ukrainian ice dancer
 Nadezhda Gumerova (Надежда Гумерова, born 1949), Kazakhstani long-distance runner
 Nadezhda Ilyina (Надежда Ильина, born 1949), Olympic bronze medal-winning Soviet sprinter
 Nadezhda Khnykina-Dvalishvili (Надежда Хныкина-Двалишвили, ნადეჟდა დვალიშვილ-ხნიკინა, 1933–1994), Olympic bronze medal-winning Soviet track and field athlete
 Nadezhda Konyayeva (Надежда Коняева, born 1931), Olympic bronze medal-winning Soviet javelin thrower
 Nadezhda Kosintseva (Надежда Косинцева, born 1985), Russian chess player
 Nadia Marcinko (Naďa or Nadežda Marcinková, born 1986), Slovak American pilot
 Naďa Mertová, Czechoslovak orienteering competitor
 Nadezhda Mushta (Надежда Мушта, born 1953, married name Olizarenko), Olympic gold and bronze medal-winning Soviet middle distance runner
 Nadezhda Ralldugina (born 1957), Soviet middle distance runner
 Nadezhda Stepanova (born 1959), Russian long-distance runner
 Nadezhda Torlopova (Надежда Торлопова, born 1978), Olympic silver medal-winning Russian boxer
 Nadezhda Vinogradova (born 1958), Soviet heptathlete
 Nadezhda Wijenberg (Надежда Вейенберг, born 1964), Russian-born long-distance runner who represented the Netherlands at the Sydney Olympics in 2000
 Nadezhda Yakubovich (Надежда Якубович, born 1954), Soviet javelin thrower
 Nadezhda Yevstyukhina (Надежда Евстюхина, born 1988), Russian weightlifter

In the arts 
 Nadezhda Babkina (born 1950) is a Russian and Soviet folk singer.
 Nadežda Čačinovič (born 1947), Croatian philosopher, sociologist and author of Slovene descent
 Naďa Konvalinková (Naděžda Konvalinková; born 1951), Czech actress
 Nadezhda Mandelstam (Надежда Мандельштам, 1899–1980), Russian writer and wife of poet Osip Mandelstam
 Nadezhda von Meck (Надежда фон Мекк, 1831–1894), Russian widow best known for her relationship with Pyotr Ilyich Tchaikovsky
 Nadezhda Mikhalkova (Надежда Михалкова, born 1986), Russian actress and daughter of Nikita Mikhalkov
 Nadezhda Misyakova (Надежда Мисякова, born 2000), Belarusian singer
 Nadezhda Obukhova (Надежда Обухова, 1886–1961), Russian mezzo-soprano
 Nadežda Petrović (Надежда Петровић, 1873–1915), Serbian painter
 Nadezhda Plevitskaya (Надежда Плевицкая, 1884–1940), Russian singer
 Nađa Regin (Nadežda Poderegin, 1931–2019), Serbian singer
 Nadezhda Repina (Надежда Репина, 1809–1867), Russian actress and soprano
 Nadezhda Rumyantseva (Надежда Румянцева, 1930–2008), Soviet and Russian actress
 Nadezhda Teffi (Надежда Тэффи, 1872–1952), Russian humorist writer
 Nadezhda Udaltsova (Надежда Удальцова, 1886–1961), Russian avant-garde artist
 Nadezhda Zabela-Vrubel (Надежда Забела–Врубель, 1868–1913), Russian soprano

In the military 
 Nadezhda Durova (Надежда Дурова, 1783–1866), woman who became a decorated soldier during the Napoleonic wars
 Nadezhda Popova (Надежда Попова, 1921–2013), squadron commander during World War II awarded the title Hero of the Soviet Union

Fictional characters 
 Nadezhda, original Russian name of Elizabeth Jennings on the TV series The Americans
 Nadezhda, on the TV series Dexter, who goes by the diminutive Nadia
Nadia, on the TV series LOST, is Sayid's love interest.
Nadia, the main character on the Netflix TV series Russian Doll.

See also

 Nadia
 Nadine (given name)
 Slavic names

Russian feminine given names
Serbian feminine given names
Ukrainian feminine given names
Slavic feminine given names
Bulgarian feminine given names